Jude Lakmal Wijethunge (died 30 March 1996), was a Lieutenant Commander in the Sri Lanka Navy. As a Lieutenant, he commanded the Dvora-class fast patrol boat P458 of the 4th Fast Attack Flotilla. He was posthumously awarded the Parama Weera Vibhushanaya, Sri Lanka's highest military award for gallantry, for his actions on 30 March 1996 in defending a Navy transport from a Sea Tiger attack. As part of an escort to the transport vessel, Wijethunge fought off repeated attacks until his craft had suffered severe damage including to its engines, and all his crew were incapacitated. Noticing a Sea Tiger suicide boat, Wijethunge maneuvered the P458 to intercept it causing the suicide boat to ram into his vessel. The resulting explosion destroyed both vessels, thereby saving the transport vessel which was the target of the suicide boat. Two members of his crew were later rescued from the waters. He was posthumously promoted to the rank of Lieutenant Commander in addition to receiving the Parama Weera Vibhushanaya, and is the first naval officer to receive the award.

Wijethunge is one of only two navy recipients of the Parama Weera Vibhushanaya, the other being Chief Petty Officer K. G. Shantha.

References 

Recipients of the Parama Weera Vibhushanaya
Sri Lanka Navy officers
Year of birth missing
1996 deaths
Sri Lankan military personnel killed in action